Hot Dog on a Stick is a fast food company that was founded by Dave Barham in Santa Monica, California, in 1946,  and later branched out into malls and shopping centers. In 2014, the company was purchased by Global Franchise Group (the strategic brand management company behind Great American Cookies, Marble Slab Creamery, and Pretzelmaker) based in Atlanta, GA. Under GFG, the brand has opened new locations across the country and moved into the franchising space.

History
The first Hot Dog on a Stick store opened at the original Muscle Beach location next to the Santa Monica Pier in Santa Monica, California, in 1946, serving lemonade and corn dogs on sticks to people on the beach. The second location opened in the late 50s at Pacific Ocean Park (also sometimes stylized as "P.O.P." and not to be confused with the current Pacific Park Pier in Santa Monica today) in Santa Monica, California. In 1962, a third location was opened on the Redondo Beach Pier, which remains the only independently owned location under the name "Craig's Hot Dog on a Stick."   Hot Dog on a Stick later expanded and became a large food chain. Hot Dog on a Stick currently has just 35 United States locations, which are primarily located in popular regional shopping malls. There are also internationally franchised locations, in Korea and Shanghai, China.

On June 28, 2021, Global Franchise Group announced that it would be acquired by FAT Brands, owners of Fatburger and Johnny Rockets. The acquisition was completed on July 22.

References

External links
 

1946 establishments in California
2014 mergers and acquisitions
American companies established in 1946
companies based in Carlsbad, California
companies based in Santa Monica, California
companies that filed for Chapter 11 bankruptcy in 2014
Hot dog restaurants in the United States
restaurants established in 1946